The Georgian Mountain (Georgian: ქართული მთის საქონელი) is a local cattle breed from The Republic of Georgia.They can be black, black and white or red and white in colour. The live weight of mature cows is 220–280 kg and that of bulls is 270–370 kg.

References

Cattle breeds
Cattle breeds originating in Georgia (country)